Tony Schiena a former South African intelligence operator turned government defense contractor and actor. He is the CEO of MOSAIC (Multi Operational Security Agency Intelligence Company), a company providing private security, counter terrorism training, and other similar services. Schiena was featured in the Vice documentary Superpower for Hire. He has been credited for exposing ISIS use of chemical warfare against the Kurds in Iraq. Schiena has been a sought-after expert voice by CNN, FOX News, CBC, BBC, ABC and various other networks on the subject of terrorism and espionage, ISIS, and modern-day slavery.

Biography 
Schiena is a veteran of the African intelligence and paramilitary community. He has served in various capacities in the private security sector as well as aiding government and various law enforcement agencies. He is a Deputy Sheriff in Virginia and a Lieutenant on the ICAC (Internet Crimes Against Children) Federal Task Force, and has been appointed as special detective on specific drug interdiction task forces. He is a long-standing member of the International Police Association. He was awarded the rank of Lieutenant Colonel by the Hungarian National Guard for meritorious service. Schiena is chief counter-terrorism advisor to NSA and sheriff and senior advisor to NW3C (National White Collar Crime Center). He is on the Board of Governors of Global Society of Homeland and National Security Professionals and also an Honorary Member of Homeland Security Philanthropy Council.

Schiena has given specialist instruction to the New York Police Department, South African Police Force, Indianapolis Police Department, Merced County Sheriff Department and SWAT team as well as various military and government agencies including NATO and ISAF (International Security Assistance Force) in Iraq and Afghanistan, special operations groups in Kabul and northern Afghanistan, Cambodian special forces, Afghan National Army CID (in Mazar e Sharif Afghanistan), Hungarian and Latvian intelligence and military, Mongolian Quick Reaction Force stationed in Kabul, Croatian special forces, and the Italian air force.

Schiena is an undefeated World Heavyweight Karate Champion.

The majority of his current security operations are run through MOSAIC. His security partnerships extend outside of the US to the cities of London and Dubai and is constantly expanding into other geographical areas and sectors of security.

Schiena has attracted attention for his endeavors in Iraq where he was hired to provide training for the Kurdish Peshmerga.  He drew attention to ISIS's use of chemical weapons including mustard gas, chlorine gas, and possibly sarin against the Kurds. He trained Kurdish special forces commanders in escape & evasion, defensive tactics and counter insurgency and provided emergency lectures on how to secure front line bases against chemical attacks.

Schiena and his company also engage in anti-sex trafficking efforts. He has spoken on the topic at the United Nations, G20 women’s conference in Paris, France, and the Vatican. His organization also collaborated with CNN International on an initiative on modern-day slavery called the HEARD expose.

He wrote and stars in Darc.

References

External links 
 

South African spies
South African chief executives
Living people
Year of birth missing (living people)